East Riverfront is a St. Louis MetroLink station. The station is located near the Casino Queen and Malcolm W. Martin Memorial Park in East St. Louis, Illinois.  

East Riverfront was built on a reconstructed viaduct just east of the historic Eads Bridge and is the westernmost station in Illinois before crossing the Mississippi River into Missouri. The station is popular with Illinois commuters and has a park and ride lot with 295 spaces. 

On January 24, 2023, Metro Transit announced that East Riverfront would close on January 30 for approximately two months to accommodate platform rehabilitation and staircase replacement.

Station layout
The platforms are accessed from Front Street via a set of stairs and an elevator on either side of the Eads Bridge. The eastbound platform can also be accessed via a ramp from the upper level pedestrian walkway on the south edge of the bridge.

References

External links 
 St. Louis Metro

St. Clair County Transit District
MetroLink stations in St. Clair County, Illinois
Railway stations in the United States opened in 1994
Red Line (St. Louis MetroLink)
Blue Line (St. Louis MetroLink)